WDTM (1150 AM) is a radio station licensed to Selmer, Tennessee, United States. The station is owned by Michael Brandt, through licensee Southern Broadcasting LLC.

References

External links

DTM
DTM